Carlos Quinteros (nom de guerre: Miguel) was a Guatemalan communist. Quinteros was a member of the Guatemalan Party of Labour (PGT). When PGT split in 1978 he became a leading figure in the more militant PGT-NDN break-away group. However, he soon left PGT-NDN and joined Guatemalan Party of Labour - Communist Party (PGT-PC). Soon, however he was expelled from PGT-PC.

In 1983 Quinteros was captured by the state forces. He soon turned into a collaborator and started providing information about his former comrades in PGT, PGT-NDN, PGT-PC. In total, around 70 people were captured and killed. In some cases Quinteros himself took part in the executions. PGT-PC was essentially wiped out in this process and PGT-NDN was reduced to the party leader and closest associates in exile.

Quinteros was eventually killed by his former comrades.

This events are told in the book El Filo (1993). 

Guatemalan Party of Labour politicians
National Directive Nucleus of the Guatemalan Party of Labour politicians
Guatemalan Party of Labour – Communist Party politicians
Year of death missing
Year of birth missing